Kevin Wilson (born 13 September 1976) is a Jamaican football striker who currently plays for Arnett Gardens F.C.

Club career
Nicknamed 'Pele', he has also played two seasons (1998 and 2005) for Montreal Impact in the USL First Division. He scored nine goals for Montreal in the 1998 season, and returned in 2005 to make an impact by scoring two goals in his first game against the Puerto Rico Islanders. He only scored one goal more and played eight games in total that season.

International career
He made his debut for the Reggae Boyz in 1995, but never managed to become a regular squad member. He scored on his debut for Jamaica versus Norway. The game ended in a 1–1 draw.  He played his last international match in 2002 against India.

External links
 Profile at Golocaljamaica

References

1976 births
Living people
Expatriate soccer players in Canada
Association football forwards
Jamaican expatriate footballers
Jamaican expatriate sportspeople in Canada
Jamaican footballers
Jamaica international footballers
Montreal Impact (1992–2011) players
USL First Division players
Arnett Gardens F.C. players
Place of birth missing (living people)
National Premier League players